The 1979–80 NBA season was the Detroit Pistons' 32nd season in the NBA and 23rd season in the city of Detroit. The Pistons were coming off a 30–52 (.366) record from their first season in the Eastern Conference, and aiming to halt declines of six and eight wins from their previous two seasons, but by finishing 16–66 (.195) they had the worst record in franchise history, and the worst NBA record since the 1972–73 Philadelphia 76ers won only nine games. 

Coach Dick Vitale, who was also in charge of player personnel, was fired 12 games into the season, having pushed for a disastrous trade with the Boston Celtics for Bob McAdoo when Pistons free agent M.L. Carr signed with Boston that would eventually net the Celtics key championship components Carr, Robert Parrish, and Kevin McHale in a series of exchanges.  Injuries to McAdoo and center Bob Lanier, who was traded during the season, left the Pistons a depleted roster and the team finished with fourteen consecutive defeats.  Second year players John Long (19.4 ppg) and Terry Tyler (12.3 ppg, 7.6 rpg) had solid seasons to lead the overwhelmed Pistons.

Draft picks

Roster

Regular season

Season standings

z - clinched division title
y - clinched division title
x - clinched playoff spot

Record vs. opponents

Game log

Regular season

|- align="center" bgcolor="#ccffcc"
| 1
| October 12
| Indiana
| W 114–105
|
|
|
| Pontiac Silverdome
| 1–0
|- align="center" bgcolor="#ccffcc"
| 2
| October 13
| @ San Antonio
| W 112–110
|
|
|
| HemisFair Arena
| 2–0
|- align="center" bgcolor="#ffcccc"
| 3
| October 16
| @ Cleveland
| L 117–137
|
|
|
| Richfield Coliseum
| 2–1
|- align="center" bgcolor="#ccffcc"
| 4
| October 18
| New York
| W 129–115
|
|
|
| Pontiac Silverdome
| 3–1
|- align="center" bgcolor="#ffcccc"
| 5
| October 19
| @ Philadelphia
| L 104–112
|
|
|
| The Spectrum
| 3–2
|- align="center" bgcolor="#ffcccc"
| 6
| October 20
| @ Washington
| L 106–117
|
|
|
| Capital Centre
| 3–3
|- align="center" bgcolor="#ccffcc"
| 7
| October 24
| Washington
| W 104–103
|
|
|
| Pontiac Silverdome
| 4–3
|- align="center" bgcolor="#ffcccc"
| 8
| October 26
| San Antonio
| L 113–129
|
|
|
| Pontiac Silverdome
| 4–4
|- align="center" bgcolor="#ffcccc"
| 9
| October 27
| @ Milwaukee
| L 118–132
|
|
|
| MECCA Arena
| 4–5

|- align="center" bgcolor="#ffcccc"
| 10
| November 1
| Cleveland
| L 125–127
|
|
|
| Pontiac Silverdome
| 4–6
|- align="center" bgcolor="#ffcccc"
| 11
| November 3
| Houston
| L 111–114
|
|
|
| Pontiac Silverdome
| 4–7
|- align="center" bgcolor="#ffcccc"
| 12
| November 7
| Atlanta
| L 107–115
|
|
|
| Pontiac Silverdome
| 4–8
|- align="center" bgcolor="#ccffcc"
| 13
| November 9
| Philadelphia
| W 106–98
|
|
|
| Pontiac Silverdome
| 5–8
|- align="center" bgcolor="#ffcccc"
| 14
| November 10
| @ Houston
| L 104–112
|
|
|
| The Summit
| 5–9
|- align="center" bgcolor="#ffcccc"
| 15
| November 14
| @ Boston
| L 111–115
|
|
|
| Boston Garden
| 5–10
|- align="center" bgcolor="#ffcccc"
| 16
| November 17
| New Jersey
| L 93–98
|
|
|
| Pontiac Silverdome
| 5–11
|- align="center" bgcolor="#ffcccc"
| 17
| November 20
| @ Atlanta
| L 105–109
|
|
|
| The Omni
| 5–12
|- align="center" bgcolor="#ccffcc"
| 18
| November 21
| Utah
| W 98–93
|
|
|
| Pontiac Silverdome
| 6–12
|- align="center" bgcolor="#ccffcc"
| 19
| November 23
| Milwaukee
| W 119–100
|
|
|
| Pontiac Silverdome
| 7–12
|- align="center" bgcolor="#ffcccc"
| 20
| November 24
| @ Indiana
| L 97–115
|
|
|
| Market Square Arena
| 7–13
|- align="center" bgcolor="#ffcccc"
| 21
| November 27
| @ New York
| L 114–116 (OT)
|
|
|
| Madison Square Garden
| 7–14
|- align="center" bgcolor="#ffcccc"
| 22
| November 28
| @ New Jersey
| L 89–98
|
|
|
| Rutgers Athletic Center
| 7–15
|- align="center" bgcolor="#ffcccc"
| 23
| November 29
| Kansas City
| L 95–105
|
|
|
| Pontiac Silverdome
| 7–16

|- align="center" bgcolor="#ccffcc"
| 24
| December 1
| San Antonio
| W 134–124
|
|
|
| Pontiac Silverdome
| 8–16
|- align="center" bgcolor="#ffcccc"
| 25
| December 4
| Boston
| L 114–118 (OT)
|
|
|
| Pontiac Silverdome
| 8–17
|- align="center" bgcolor="#ffcccc"
| 26
| December 5
| @ Kansas City
| L 93–109
|
|
|
| Municipal Auditorium
| 8–18
|- align="center" bgcolor="#ffcccc"
| 27
| December 7
| @ Houston
| L 109–124
|
|
|
| The Summit
| 8–19
|- align="center" bgcolor="#ffcccc"
| 28
| December 8
| @ Indiana
| L 102–103
|
|
|
| Market Square Arena
| 8–20
|- align="center" bgcolor="#ccffcc"
| 29
| December 12
| @ Golden State
| W 114–96
|
|
|
| Oakland–Alameda County Coliseum Arena
| 9–20
|- align="center" bgcolor="#ffcccc"
| 30
| December 14
| @ Los Angeles
| L 122–138
|
|
|
| The Forum
| 9–21
|- align="center" bgcolor="#ffcccc"
| 31
| December 15
| @ Phoenix
| L 105–126
|
|
|
| Arizona Veterans Memorial Coliseum
| 9–22
|- align="center" bgcolor="#ffcccc"
| 32
| December 16
| @ San Diego
| L 126–133
|
|
|
| San Diego Sports Arena
| 9–23
|- align="center" bgcolor="#ffcccc"
| 33
| December 18
| Philadelphia
| L 102–114
|
|
|
| Pontiac Silverdome
| 9–24
|- align="center" bgcolor="#ffcccc"
| 34
| December 20
| Atlanta
| L 103–122
|
|
|
| Pontiac Silverdome
| 9–25
|- align="center" bgcolor="#ffcccc"
| 35
| December 22
| @ San Antonio
| L 112–141
|
|
|
| HemisFair Arena
| 9–26
|- align="center" bgcolor="#ffcccc"
| 36
| December 25
| @ Cleveland
| L 101–111
|
|
|
| Richfield Coliseum
| 9–27
|- align="center" bgcolor="#ffcccc"
| 37
| December 26
| Indiana
| L 97–98
|
|
|
| Pontiac Silverdome
| 9–28
|- align="center" bgcolor="#ccffcc"
| 38
| December 28
| Denver
| W 114–98
|
|
|
| Pontiac Silverdome
| 10–28
|- align="center" bgcolor="#ffcccc"
| 39
| December 29
| @ Atlanta
| L 104–115
|
|
|
| The Omni
| 10–29

|- align="center" bgcolor="#ffcccc"
| 40
| January 2
| @ Denver
| L 116–135
|
|
|
| McNichols Sports Arena
| 10–30
|- align="center" bgcolor="#ffcccc"
| 41
| January 4
| @ Seattle
| L 105–123
|
|
|
| Kingdome
| 10–31
|- align="center" bgcolor="#ffcccc"
| 42
| January 6
| @ Portland
| L 102–119
|
|
|
| Memorial Coliseum
| 10–32
|- align="center" bgcolor="#ffcccc"
| 43
| January 8
| @ Utah
| L 110–124
|
|
|
| Salt Palace
| 10–33
|- align="center" bgcolor="#ffcccc"
| 44
| January 11
| Los Angeles
| L 100–123
|
|
|
| Pontiac Silverdome
| 10–34
|- align="center" bgcolor="#ffcccc"
| 45
| January 12
| @ Indiana
| L 109–122
|
|
|
| Market Square Arena
| 10–35
|- align="center" bgcolor="#ccffcc"
| 46
| January 13
| Chicago
| W 107–102
|
|
|
| Pontiac Silverdome
| 11–35
|- align="center" bgcolor="#ccffcc"
| 47
| January 17
| Washington
| W 110–107
|
|
|
| Pontiac Silverdome
| 12–35
|- align="center" bgcolor="#ccffcc"
| 48
| January 19
| Houston
| W 122–110
|
|
|
| Pontiac Silverdome
| 13–35
|- align="center" bgcolor="#ffcccc"
| 49
| January 22
| @ Chicago
| L 131–145
|
|
|
| Chicago Stadium
| 13–36
|- align="center" bgcolor="#ffcccc"
| 50
| January 23
| Boston
| L 104–131
|
|
|
| Pontiac Silverdome
| 13–37
|- align="center" bgcolor="#ccffcc"
| 51
| January 25
| @ New Jersey
| W 119–116
|
|
|
| Rutgers Athletic Center
| 14–37
|- align="center" bgcolor="#ffcccc"
| 52
| January 27
| New York
| L 93–98
|
|
|
| Pontiac Silverdome
| 14–38
|- align="center" bgcolor="#ffcccc"
| 53
| January 29
| Golden State
| L 100–111
|
|
|
| Pontiac Silverdome
| 14–39
|- align="center" bgcolor="#ffcccc"
| 54
| January 30
| @ Philadelphia
| L 108–121
|
|
|
| The Spectrum
| 14–40

|- align="center" bgcolor="#ffcccc"
| 55
| February 7
| Seattle
| L 102–119
|
|
|
| Pontiac Silverdome
| 14–41
|- align="center" bgcolor="#ffcccc"
| 56
| February 9
| @ New York
| L 107–114
|
|
|
| Madison Square Garden
| 14–42
|- align="center" bgcolor="#ffcccc"
| 57
| February 10
| @ Boston
| L 111–128
|
|
|
| Boston Garden
| 14–43
|- align="center" bgcolor="#ffcccc"
| 58
| February 13
| Cleveland
| L 102–107
|
|
|
| Pontiac Silverdome
| 14–44
|- align="center" bgcolor="#ffcccc"
| 59
| February 15
| Philadelphia
| L 104–114
|
|
|
| Pontiac Silverdome
| 14–45
|- align="center" bgcolor="#ffcccc"
| 60
| February 16
| @ Cleveland
| L 104–123
|
|
|
| Richfield Coliseum
| 14–46
|- align="center" bgcolor="#ffcccc"
| 61
| February 17
| Atlanta
| L 99–108
|
|
|
| Pontiac Silverdome
| 14–47
|- align="center" bgcolor="#ffcccc"
| 62
| February 21
| Phoenix
| L 116–125
|
|
|
| Pontiac Silverdome
| 14–48
|- align="center" bgcolor="#ffcccc"
| 63
| February 23
| Portland
| L 107–130
|
|
|
| Pontiac Silverdome
| 14–49
|- align="center" bgcolor="#ffcccc"
| 64
| February 27
| San Diego
| L 113–129
|
|
|
| Pontiac Silverdome
| 14–50
|- align="center" bgcolor="#ccffcc"
| 65
| February 29
| New Jersey
| W 137–128 (OT)
|
|
|
| Pontiac Silverdome
| 15–50

|- align="center" bgcolor="#ffcccc"
| 66
| March 2
| @ Boston
| L 115–118
|
|
|
| Boston Garden
| 15–51
|- align="center" bgcolor="#ffcccc"
| 67
| March 4
| @ Washington
| L 107–135
|
|
|
| Capital Centre
| 15–52
|- align="center" bgcolor="#ccffcc"
| 68
| March 5
| New York
| W 120–113
|
|
|
| Pontiac Silverdome
| 16–52
|- align="center" bgcolor="#ffcccc"
| 69
| March 7
| Washington
| L 105–106
|
|
|
| Pontiac Silverdome
| 16–53
|- align="center" bgcolor="#ffcccc"
| 70
| March 8
| @ New York
| L 104–110
|
|
|
| Madison Square Garden
| 16–54
|- align="center" bgcolor="#ffcccc"
| 71
| March 9
| @ New Jersey
| L 100–140
|
|
|
| Rutgers Athletic Center
| 16–55
|- align="center" bgcolor="#ffcccc"
| 72
| March 12
| New Jersey
| L 119–137
|
|
|
| Pontiac Silverdome
| 16–56
|- align="center" bgcolor="#ffcccc"
| 73
| March 14
| San Antonio
| L 102–113
|
|
|
| Pontiac Silverdome
| 16–57
|- align="center" bgcolor="#ffcccc"
| 74
| March 16
| Houston
| L 99–102
|
|
|
| Pontiac Silverdome
| 16–58
|- align="center" bgcolor="#ffcccc"
| 75
| March 17
| @ Philadelphia
| L 109–123
|
|
|
| The Spectrum
| 16–59
|- align="center" bgcolor="#ffcccc"
| 76
| March 18
| Cleveland
| L 107–108 (OT)
|
|
|
| Pontiac Silverdome
| 16–60
|- align="center" bgcolor="#ffcccc"
| 77
| March 20
| Boston
| L 106–124
|
|
|
| Pontiac Silverdome
| 16–61
|- align="center" bgcolor="#ffcccc"
| 78
| March 21
| @ Atlanta
| L 95–108
|
|
|
| The Omni
| 16–62
|- align="center" bgcolor="#ffcccc"
| 79
| March 23
| @ Washington
| L 114–119
|
|
|
| Capital Centre
| 16–63
|- align="center" bgcolor="#ffcccc"
| 80
| March 26
| Indiana
| L 114–124
|
|
|
| Pontiac Silverdome
| 16–64
|- align="center" bgcolor="#ffcccc"
| 81
| March 28
| @ Houston
| L 112–128
|
|
|
| The Summit
| 16–65
|- align="center" bgcolor="#ffcccc"
| 82
| March 30
| @ San Antonio
| L 124–144
|
|
|
| HemisFair Arena
| 16–66

See also
 1980 in Michigan

References

See also
1979–80 NBA season

Detroit Pistons seasons
Det
Detroit Pistons
Detroit Pistons